The Dental Schools Council represents the interests of Irish and UK dental schools as it relates to national health, wealth, knowledge acquisition through teaching, research, and the profession of dentistry. Composed of the Dean or equivalent of each dental school in the UK and Ireland, the current chair is Professor Chris Deery, Dean, School of Clinical Dentistry at the University of Sheffield. The Dental Schools Council meet three times per year in February, June and October.

The Dental Schools Council History
The Dental Schools Council began life as the Education Consultative Committee of the Dental Schools of Great Britain on 31 January 1931 when Mr W. Malcolm Knott (President of the British Dental Association in 1930) invited several Dental Deans to come together to discuss the formation of a Dental School Committee to discuss all matters relating to dental education. Twelve dental schools were represented at the first meeting, with each member donating one guinea to cover expenses. The first topic discussed was the recommendation of a General Medical Council to maintain dental standards in the United Kingdom. The Education Consultative Committee of the Dental Schools of Great Britain enabled the university staff to play a greater role in determining, co-ordinating and agreeing standards in the dental curriculum.

Previous names
The Dental Schools Council has been referred to under many names since its formation. In 1932, a formal constitution was approved resulting in a new name - The Dental Education Advisory Committee of Great Britain and Ireland, which was later changed in 1937 to the Dental Education Advisory Council of Great Britain and Ireland (DEAC). In order to align itself with the Council of Heads of Medical Schools - now the Medical Schools Council - the DEAC changed its name in 1993 to the Council of Deans of Dental Schools (CDDS).  However, it was later decided in 2005 that it was necessary to change the name to Council of Heads and Deans of Dental Schools to reflect that not all members of the organisation were given the title ‘Dean’.  2008 saw a final name change to the Dental Schools Council to reflect the expertise at all levels within the dental schools, from not only the Heads and Deans but also other dedicated staff members including admissions tutors, administrators and students themselves.

Senior Officers Group
In 2007, the Dental Schools Senior Officers Group was convened, fostering formal and regular dialogue on key issues between Dental Schools across the UK at Senior Administrator Level. The Senior Officers Group meet twice a year in February and October (as a joint meeting with the Dental Schools Council). The current Chair is Anna Burrows, Senior Administrator at the University of Sheffield School of Clinical Dentistry.

Members
The Dental School Council consists of the 18 dental schools in the UK and 2 in Ireland. These are:

School of Medicine and Dentistry, University of Aberdeen
Barts and The London School of Medicine and Dentistry
The School of Dentistry, University of Birmingham
Bristol Dental School, University of Bristol
School of Dentistry, Cardiff University
Cork University Dental School and Hospital, University College Cork
Dundee Dental School, University of Dundee
Edinburgh Postgraduate Dental Institute
Glasgow Dental Hospital and School
King's College London Dental Institute
Leeds Dental Institute
The University of Liverpool School of Dentistry
School of Dentistry, University of Manchester
The School of Dental Sciences, University of Newcastle upon Tyne
Peninsula Dental School, Peninsula College of Medicine and Dentistry
The School of Dentistry, Queen's University of Belfast
The School of Clinical Dentistry, University of Sheffield
School of Dental Science, Trinity College Dublin
School of Dentistry, University of Central Lancashire
UCL Eastman Dental Institute

Associated Organisations
The Dental Schools Council promotes dental education and research through collaboration with:

 Universities UK
 Higher Education Funding Bodies
 National Health Service
 Government Departments
 General Dental Council
 Academy of Medical Royal Colleges
 Research Councils
 Dental research charities
 Association of Medical Research Charities
 Medical Schools Council
 Association of UK University Hospitals
 British Dental Association

References

External links
Omnipark Dental Centre

Dental organisations based in the United Kingdom
Dentistry education in the United Kingdom
Higher education organisations based in the United Kingdom
Higher education regulators